Humbertioturraea is a genus of flowering plants belonging to the family Meliaceae.

It is native to Madagascar.

The genus name of Humbertioturraea is in honour of Jean-Henri Humbert (1887–1967), a French botanist born in Paris, and  
later portion of the name refers to Turraea a genus of plants in the same family of Meliaceae.
The genus was first described and published by Jean-François Leroy in Compt. Rend. Hebd. Séances Acad. Sci. Séries D Vol.269 on page 2322  in 1969.

Known species
According to Kew:

Humbertioturraea baronii 
Humbertioturraea decaryana 
Humbertioturraea grandidieri 
Humbertioturraea labatii 
Humbertioturraea maculata 
Humbertioturraea malifolia 
Humbertioturraea rhamnifolia 
Humbertioturraea seyrigii

References

Meliaceae
Meliaceae genera
Plants described in 1969
Endemic flora of Madagascar